Mreža TV is a Bosnian television network founded in 2011.

With a syndicated broadcasting programme under the "Mreža" label, 8 TV stations have managed to cover 92.12 percent of the territory of Bosnia and Herzegovina, including major Bosnian cities (Sarajevo, Banja Luka, Mostar, Brčko, Tuzla).

Mreža TV airs TV series, telenovels, movies and entertainment shows. Its direct competitor in BiH is Program Plus network.

Current broadcasters
 O Kanal from Sarajevo
 TV Alfa from Sarajevo
 Televizija K3 from Prnjavor
 TV HIT from Brčko
 TV Slon Extra from Tuzla
 Centralne Nacionalne Novosti from Sarajevo

Former broadcasters
Former affiliations were: 
 Behar TV
 OSM TV
 NTV 101
 HTV Oscar C 2
 RTV Zenica
 RTV USK
 RTV TK,
 RTM Mostar

References

External links
Official website 
O Kanal 

Television stations in Bosnia and Herzegovina
Television channels and stations established in 2011
2011 establishments in Bosnia and Herzegovina